MA 2412  is an Austrian television series that satirizes the bureaucracy in public administration in the form of a fictional "Municipal Department (Magistratsabteilung) for Christmas Decorations" of the city of Vienna.

See also
List of Austrian television series

External links
 

Austrian television series
ORF (broadcaster) original programming
1990s Austrian television series
2000s Austrian television series
2002 Austrian television series endings
1998 Austrian television series debuts
Austrian comedy television series
German-language television shows
Satirical television shows
Bureaucracy in fiction